Keck may refer to:

 Keck (surname)
 Keck, Kentucky, an unincorporated community, United States
 5811 Keck, an asteroid
 Keck, another name for Cow Parsley

Science 
W. M. Keck Foundation, an American charitable foundation
W. M. Keck Observatory at the Mauna Kea in Hawaii
Keck School of Medicine of USC at the University of Southern California
Keck Graduate Institute of Applied Life Sciences in Claremont, California
Keck Geology Consortium, a collaboration of colleges promoting undergraduate earth science research
Keck Array, a microwave polarimeter at the South Pole